Henry Drake may refer to:

Henry Drake, character in Blackout Effect
Hattie O. and Henry Drake Octagon House

See also
Harry Drake (disambiguation)